Mark Emke (born 18 July 1959) is a Dutch rower. He competed in the men's quadruple sculls event at the 1984 Summer Olympics. He later became head coach of the Dutch national team.

References

External links
 

1959 births
Living people
Dutch male rowers
Olympic rowers of the Netherlands
Rowers at the 1984 Summer Olympics
Rowers from Amsterdam